Wyoming Seminary, founded in 1844, is a Methodist college preparatory school located in the Wyoming Valley of Northeastern Pennsylvania. The "Lower School," which consists of preschool - 8th-grade students, is located in Forty Fort. The "Upper School," comprising 9th-grade to postgraduate students, is located in Kingston. It is near the Susquehanna River and the city of Wilkes-Barre. Locally and in some publications, it is sometimes referred to as "Sem." As a boarding school, only Upper School students may board on campus. Slightly more than one-third of the Upper School student body resides on campus.

History

Founding and early years (1844–1892)
Methodist Church leaders founded Wyoming Seminary in 1844 at the instigation of the Rev. George Peck. The school's first president was Rueben Nelson, and in its first year, 138 students enrolled — 69 boys and 69 girls from Pennsylvania and New York. At the time, Kingston was a rural village, and the school raised livestock, grew its own produce, and built a smokehouse to preserve meat for the winter. As the town industrialized, the school grew, adding a dedicated business school and establishing a college preparatory program. While the school remains affiliated with the United Methodist Church, it welcomes students from all religious backgrounds.

The Sprague era and continued growth (1892–1967)

Much of Wyoming Seminary's rise from a rural academy to a prominent college preparatory school took place during the tenure of Levi Sprague. A graduate, Sprague was its president for five decades from the 1880s to the 1930s and was associated with the school for most of his life, dying in office. The Upper School campus is on Sprague Avenue; the central building that hosts most classes and administrative offices there is named Sprague Hall, which features a bust of Sprague; and since 1993, a yearly scholarship for seniors that offers free boarding for eight selected student-leaders is called the Levi Sprague Fellowship.

In 1892, the Wyoming Seminary football team participated in the world's first nighttime football game, playing against Mansfield University (then Mansfield State Normal School). The game ended at halftime due to insufficient lighting, with neither team scoring. The school grew in the early 20th century. From 1917 to 1919, the school used parts of the campus to train American soldiers during World War I. By the early 1950s, Sem expanded to include what is today considered the "lower school", composed of nursery through eighth-grade students. In 1951, Sem merged with the Wilkes-Barre Day School to become the region's only independent school to offer a complete program ranging from nursery through secondary school. In 1998, Sem's Lower School, located three miles from Kingston in nearby Forty Fort, expanded its program by adding a prekindergarten-3 program and renaming its nursery school grade as prekindergarten-4.

In the 1960s, the school dissolved its business and music schools. It left the college preparatory program as the secondary school's focus when Dr. Wallace F. Stettler became its ninth president in 1967. In June 1972, flooding from Hurricane Agnes severely damaged parts of the Upper School campus. Stettler accepted significant federal aid from the Nixon administration, hand-delivered in the form of a check from graduate and Nixon Wilkes-Barre area flood response director Frank Carlucci, to help revive its campus.

This federal aid, combined with charitable contributions, funded the construction of the Bell Tower, the Buckingham Performing Arts Center, the Pettebone-Dickson Student Center, renovations in Sprague Hall, and the Learning Resources Center, which includes a library, several classrooms, admissions offices, and a large conference room. This center is today named the Stettler Learning Resources Center. The Upper School completed those changes in a short four-year period between 1974 and 1978. The school's endowment grew significantly, tripling by the early 1990s. At the same time, the school's vibrancy and community spirit were enhanced just years after the flood by the enormous success of the football team under coach Marvin Antinnes. During the late 1970s and early 1980s, Antinnes oversaw over thirty consecutive wins for the team for several seasons. When Stettler died in October 2010, the Times Leader recalled in his obituary that "Stettler not only rebuilt what had been damaged in the flood, he expanded the campus." In the same article, Sem's vice president of advancement, John H. Shafer, recounted that Stettler "made it possible for Wyoming Seminary to emerge from the flood an even stronger institution."

The Packard era (1990–2007)
Stettler retired in 1990, succeeded by Dr. H. Jeremy Packard. Under Packard, the school's tenth president, the school continued to expand, including academics, arts, the extracurricular program, athletics, and technology as the age of the Internet dawned. These expansions also included further renovations on its Upper School campus, such as the 2006 construction of Klassner Field, named for athletics director Karen Klassner, for field hockey and lacrosse games. Sem also bought a former bank adjacent to its Upper School campus to become the Great Hall, used today by the wrestling team as its practice facility. Regarding buildings already on the Upper School campus, Sem's Sprague Hall, which includes all administrative offices and three floors of classrooms in all subjects except science, expanded to include a renovated, modernized new wing in 1999. At the Lower School, similar changes were made, including constructing a new wing for fourth and fifth-grade students and a new glass foyer.

In athletics, in 1993, junior Kristina Benson became the first student to join what had previously been an exclusively male varsity ice hockey team. By 2001, Wyoming Seminary's Upper School Men's tennis team won the team state title, becoming the first to do so in all of Wyoming Seminary's history. Math teacher O. Charles Lull led the team. The SEM Upper School field hockey team won the state championship title that same year. Since then, the field hockey team, under the leadership of athletic director and longtime field hockey coach Karen Klassner, has also won four other state championships in 2006, 2008, 2010, and 2011. The victory in November 2010 was a 5–0 victory. The growth of the school's athletic program also included significant success for the Upper School wrestling team. Since 2007, the team has won five consecutive state prep championship titles, has ranked highly among all private high schools in the nation since the early 2000s, and placed second at the 2009 National Preps Wrestling Tournament. In the extracurricular program, Sem's Model United Nations and Mock Trial groups grew in size and earned championship titles in the region and the country. In the field of technology, the school embraced Mac computers, putting Macintosh computers in classrooms and 'computer rooms' in both the Lower School and Upper School and using these devices frequently in classroom settings.

The makeup of Sem's Upper School administration also underwent an overhaul. For one, Karen Klassner became the first woman to hold several high-ranking positions, including Dean of Students, for some time in the 1990s. However, by 2003, the school eliminated the Dean of Students position, delegating those responsibilities to the Upper School Dean. Before 2003, there existed both a Dean of Students and a Dean of Upper School. At the same time, the school also introduced the position of Dean of Faculty and a new Class Deans system in which a dean presides over each class and typically remains with a given class for the entirety of its four-year run. Amid the dawn of this new administrative system at the Upper School, the Lower School also saw changes. In 2004, the school's longtime history of having a "Dean of Lower School" changed into a new two-dean system that includes a "Dean of Primary", a "Dean of Middle School", and 'coordinators,' essentially assistant deans for the primary and middle-school grades.

The Nygren era (2007–2015)

By the time of Packard's retirement in June 2007, the school had grown significantly, building on the achievements of the Stettler era. The school's next president, Dr. Kip P. Nygren, who took office shortly after Packard's departure, presided over continued changes. These changes included a new third floor of Sprague Hall, an extensive renovation of the Lower School's first floor, and extensive restoration work on the Upper School dormitories. The most significant achievement on Nygren's watch was the construction of the Kirby Center for Creative Arts, which opened in the fall of 2014, shortly after the closing of Sprague Avenue to vehicular traffic. Despite the continued changes at Sem and academic, athletic, and extracurricular achievements, Nygren and the administration suspended the football program in 2011 and 2012. Nygren cited a lack of student interest, significant graduation rates of football players in 2010 and 2011, and other factors. At that time, Dean of Upper School Jay Harvey underscored in a statement that he and others were "developing a plan to engage administrators, trustees, alumni, and parents to review the dynamics of the program and the student-athletes and facilities necessary to ensure its success." That plan resulted in a completely renovated Nesbitt Memorial Stadium and the revival of the football program, which resumed varsity play in 2014 after completing a successful junior varsity season in 2013. In addition, successes such as the field hockey team winning three state championships in four years (2010, 2011, and 2013) and the Mock Trial team becoming state champions for the first time in March 2011 and earning sixth place in that year's national competition have also marked Nygren's tenure. Nygren announced in February 2014 his intention to retire from the school after the 2014–2015 academic year. In late 2014, the school announced that Kevin Rea, assistant headmaster of the Hackley School in New York, would succeed Nygren as Sem's 12th president.

Governance 
Wyoming Seminary's current interim president is Daniel Rocha, who assumed his duties in June 2022. The current Board Chair is William E. Sordoni. The Dean of the Upper School is Rachel Bartron.

The school has named several members to its board of trustees.

Curriculum 
15% of Upper School graduates are accepted to colleges in the "competitive" to "most competitive" range. 98% of those who graduate from Sem successfully graduate college. 0% of students' families earn financial aid. 32% of Lower School teachers hold master's degrees compared to 51% at the Upper School. 13% of Upper School teachers hold doctorates, while 2% of Lower School teachers hold doctorates.

The average size for an Upper School course is 14 students. At WSUS, there are 39 classes offered in math and science and 76 classes offered in the humanities. The Upper School offers, in total, over 160 courses, including 25 Advanced Placement classes, more than most public or private schools in the United States. WSUS hosts more than 80 international students every year from over 20 countries and students from 15 different states.

Extracurricular activities
Nearly 300 students at the Upper School become involved in the performing arts at Sem, and 86% of students participate in at least one sport. 700 WSUS football players have played college football over the last 30 years. The Upper School field hockey team had seen 17 undefeated seasons and has won five PIAA state championship titles, including as recently as 2011, when they won the state title for the second consecutive year, the first back-to-back state championships in Sem field hockey history. The WSUS boys' basketball team won their division title four consecutive times, including as recently as 2010. The Men's tennis team has achieved great success, winning 72 straight conference matches (current streak) and achieved state runner-up status after falling in the 2012 PIAA State Championship; they were led by coach Michael Balutanski. The Upper School wrestling team has won the Pennsylvania Prep State Tournament five years in a row.

Wyoming Seminary has an active and successful Mock Trial program. Under the coaching of history teacher Adam Carlisle, the team has received numerous distinctions in pre-season state invitationals, placing 4th, 2nd, 3rd, 4th, and 2nd in 2010, 2011, 2012, 2014, and 2015, respectively, at the University of Pittsburgh Annual High School Mock Trial Tournament, the largest invitational in the Commonwealth. Sem Mock Trial has won the University of Pennsylvania's Benjamin Franklin Invitational, considered the most competitive mock trial tournament in Pennsylvania, four consecutive times, from 2012–2015, and boasts six District Championships since 2008. In state competitions, the team placed 10th, 4th, 1st, and 7th in 2008, 2010, 2011, and 2013, respectively. In 2011, after winning the State Championship, Sem Mock Trial placed 6th in the National High School Mock Trial Championship in Phoenix, Arizona. Since 2010, the program has competed in the Empire New York: The World Championship tournament in New York City, placing 4th, 2nd, 17th, 13th, and 2nd. Since 2012, the team has also competed in Princeton University's Spring Moot Court Tournament, one of the country's largest and most prestigious moot court tournaments. Their teams have placed 3rd (2012); 5th and 6th (2013); 5th, 6th, and 8th (2014); and 1st, 2nd, and 4th (2015). Attorneys Guerline L. Laurore, Daniel Hollander, and Leana Blazosek are the current attorney coaches. Latin teacher David Johnson is an assistant teacher coach.

Art, music, and drama

Wyoming Seminary Upper School requires an art history and a music history course and offers multiple art and drawing courses, music courses, and chorale. Sem's campus has two art studios, a ceramics studio, and a darkroom on campus. Each trimester, the art students put their work up in The Great Hall for display and put their work up in the fall term in Nesbitt Hall for display. Photography students have a show at the Buckingham Performing Arts Center every several months. Students can also work on art projects at the Performing Arts Institute (PAI) during the summer. Students interested in music, dance, and musical theatre spend the 42-day session on campus and are exposed to world-renowned artists. Every year, PAI hosts a theatrical production at the F.M. Kirby Center in downtown Wilkes-Barre, including Two Gentlemen of Verona in 2010 and Gypsy in 2009. Renowned actor Austin Pendleton joined the PAI cast for the production of Gypsy.

The Upper School's Madrigal Singers, a 28-voice choral group, have gained recognition for their proficiency. The group has toured worldwide — touring Asia in 2006. In the summer of 2007, the group also toured in Germany through their host, The St. Lioba School in Bad Nauheim, Germany. During the summer of 2009, the Madrigal Singers competed in an international choral competition in the Czech Republic. They entered four categories and won two gold and two silver medals. They continued this tour by singing in various locations throughout Slovakia and Hungary. In the summer of 2010, the group returned to Bad Nauheim to participate in the Festivokal singing festival. The group is under the direction of Sem performing and fine arts department chairman John M. Vaida, a member of the Sem faculty since the 1970s.

Orchestra, jazz band, chorale, and smaller ensembles are available for all students to participate in every year. Sem is the host of the Wyoming Seminary Civic Orchestra, founded by Jerome Campbell and directed by Yoon Jae Lee until 2013, where local students perform with local musicians. Pit-orchestra allows students to work with local musicians as well.

The Upper School drama department, run by 1991 Sem graduate Jason Sherry, also has many participants at the school. Sem hosts a musical in the fall, an acting workshop in the winter, and a play in the spring. Auditions are open to all students regardless of their experience and, at times, are available to faculty.

Campus
Wyoming Seminary is split between a Lower School and Upper School campus. The Upper School campus has many buildings that accommodate day students and boarders. Sprague Hall, on the corner of Market and N. Sprague Streets, is the main academic building. Nesbitt Hall, a science center, and the Back Campus act as the primary social center of the campus. The "SNOOK," or Sem Nook, is also located here. The Pettebone-Dickson Student Center, located on N. Maple Avenue, includes sports and administrative facilities. The Carpenter Athletic Center is home to two gyms, a pool, several fitness studios, and the Charles Lull Tennis Center. Klassner Field and Nesbitt Stadium are located on the outskirts of campus.

Wyoming Seminary has many housing facilities for boarders. Upper-level boys reside in Carpenter Hall, while upper-level girls are in Swetland, Fleck, and Darte Halls. Most first-year and PGs also live in these buildings. The Buckingham Performing Arts Center, established in 1975, holds many classrooms and an auditorium. New to the campus in 2014 is the Kirby Center for the Performing Arts. The Stettler Learning and Resource Center houses admissions and the Kirby Library. The Great Hall is located on Wyoming Avenue and separate from campus, mainly used for sports and wrestling facilities. A walkway connects the building to the rest of the campus.

The Lower School is mainly in one building, aside from back campus fields and a toddler learning center.

Architecture
Since 1979, the Upper School's 19th-century buildings have been listed on the National Register of Historic Places. Since 2006, portions of the Upper School campus have undergone a large-scale renovation, with the housing facilities of Swetland, Darte, and Fleck Halls renovated on the outside, the Kirby Library (on the second floor of the Stettler Center) renovated, a brand new third floor introduced in Sprague Hall, the construction of Klassner Field for field hockey and lacrosse games, the construction of the O. Charles Lull Tennis Center and a brand new first floor of the Lower School. In 2013 the school completed the renovation of Nesbitt Memorial Stadium to include two turf fields supporting football, soccer, lacrosse, field hockey, baseball, and softball, new locker rooms and field house, a new grandstand, and a press box. The Kirby Center for Creative Arts, supporting the school's music, theater, and dance programs, was completed in the fall of 2014.

Notable alumni

Notable faculty
 Cecilia Galante, author of The Patron Saint of Butterflies

References

External links

Wyoming Seminary
The Association of Boarding Schools profile
Peterson's Close-Up for Wyoming Seminary

School buildings on the National Register of Historic Places in Pennsylvania
Private high schools in Pennsylvania
Private middle schools in Pennsylvania
Private elementary schools in Pennsylvania
Boarding schools in Pennsylvania
United Methodist Church
Educational institutions established in 1844
Methodism in Pennsylvania
Schools in Luzerne County, Pennsylvania
1844 establishments in the United States
National Register of Historic Places in Luzerne County, Pennsylvania